Melanella hypsela is a species of sea snail, a marine gastropod mollusk in the family Eulimidae. The species is one of a number within the genus Melanella.

Distribution
This species occurs in the following locations:
 Bermuda
 Bahamas 
 West Indies
 Brazil (Trindade Island, Rio de Janeiro and Rio Grande do Sul)

Description 
The maximum recorded shell length is 8 mm.

Habitat 
Minimum recorded depth is 15 m. Maximum recorded depth is 525 m.

References

External links

hypsela
Gastropods described in 1900